Tales from New York: The Very Best of Simon & Garfunkel is a 40-track expanded version of The Best of Simon and Garfunkel compilation album, and the first 2-CD double album of greatest hits by the duo Simon & Garfunkel, released on March 28, 2000.

Track listing

Disc 1 
"The Sound of Silence"
"Wednesday Morning, 3 A.M."
"The Sun Is Burning"
"Peggy-O"
"Benedictus"
"He Was My Brother"
"We've Got a Groovy Thing Goin'"
"Homeward Bound"
"I Am a Rock"
"Kathy's Song"
"April Come She Will"
"Leaves That Are Green"
"Flowers Never Bend with the Rainfall"
"The Dangling Conversation"
"Scarborough Fair/Canticle"
"Patterns"
"Cloudy"
"For Emily, Whenever I May Find Her"
"Save the Life of My Child"
"7 O'Clock News/Silent Night"

Disc 2 
"A Hazy Shade of Winter"
"The 59th Street Bridge Song (Feelin' Groovy)"
"At the Zoo"
"Fakin' It"
"Punky's Dilemma"
"You Don't Know Where Your Interest Lies"
"Mrs. Robinson"
"Old Friends/Bookends"
"The Boxer"
"Baby Driver"
"Keep the Customer Satisfied"
"So Long, Frank Lloyd Wright"
"Bridge over Troubled Water"
"Cecilia"
"The Only Living Boy in New York"
"Bye Bye Love"
"Song for the Asking"
"El Condor Pasa (If I Could)"
"America"
"My Little Town"

Certifications

References

Simon & Garfunkel compilation albums
2000 greatest hits albums
Albums produced by Bob Johnston
Columbia Records compilation albums
Albums produced by Paul Simon
Albums produced by Art Garfunkel
Albums produced by Tom Wilson (record producer)
Albums produced by Roy Halee